Mumford may refer to:
Amazing Mumford, a Muppet character on Sesame Street
Mumford (film), a 1999 American comedy-drama film
Mumford procedure, also called distal clavicle excision or distal clavicle resection, an orthopedic surgical procedure used in shoulder surgery

Places 
In the United States
Mumford, Missouri, an unincorporated community
Mumford, New York, a hamlet in the town of Wheatland, New York
Mumford, Texas, an unincorporated community
Mumford High School in Detroit, Michigan

Elsewhere
Mumford, Ghana
Mount Mumford, a mountain in Antarctica

Music
Mumford & Sons, a UK folk rock band

People
Mumford (surname), people with the surname Mumford